Markus Penz (born 6 June 1975, in Innsbruck) is an Austrian skeleton racer who has competed since 2002. He finished 16th in the men's skeleton event at the 2006 Winter Olympics in Turin.

Penz also finished fourth in the men's skeleton event at the 2007 FIBT World Championships in St. Moritz.

External links
  
 
 
 
 
 2006 men's skeleton results (todor66.com)

1975 births
Austrian male skeleton racers
Living people
Olympic skeleton racers of Austria
Skeleton racers at the 2006 Winter Olympics
20th-century Austrian people
21st-century Austrian people